Livingstonville is a hamlet within the town of Broome in Schoharie County, New York, United States. It is inhabited by a small but decreasing population.

History 

Located in the southern portion of Schoharie County, Livingstonville lies between Middleburgh and Durham. The hamlet was settled by the British in the seventeenth century.

Located in the northern tier of the Catskill Mountains, settlement was not facilitated by terrain. The Catskill Creek, which flows through Livingstonville, is too shallow to allow significant travel.

Early in the nineteenth century, the town of Broome was incorporated into Schoharie County. Livingstonville is the largest hamlet in the town and is where the highway department is located.

For Schoharie County residents, Livingstonville was notable as the home of the "Trailer Graveyard", where hundreds of abandoned trailers were left near a pond. In the 2000s, this pile was cleared.  Now cleaned, the pond has been restored to its natural state.

In the past Livingstonville was thriving; there  was a small store which closed in the early 1990s, a gas station which had a souvenir shop called Losee's after the family who owned it.  Up until the early 1980s, there was a hotel with a restaurant and bar which was a community gathering point.

Today 

Livingstonville is located in a valley. The Town of Broome volunteer fire department, which is located in Livingstonville, offers Bingo in the spring and summer, Seasonal Dances, Pot Luck Dinners, as well as a Labor Day BBQ which people from various states attend.  During the months between May thru October there is a flea market.

Students from Livingstonville attend Middleburgh Central School. Livingstonville is also in Middleburgh's Zip Code of 12122. The Highway Department, located in Livingstonville, is functional.

Livingstonville tends to vote overwhelmingly Republican. Despite this, the Supervisor of Broome is Marie Campbell, a Democrat. Possible future Supervisors include Brian Chichester, who recently retired from the town road crew.

The Livingstonville Community Church was listed on the National Register of Historic Places in 2008.

References 

Hamlets in New York (state)
Hamlets in Schoharie County, New York